Lens is a bilingual hostage drama written and directed by Jayaprakash Radhakrishnan made simultaneously in Malayalam and Tamil. Dealing with the subject of voyeurism, it features Anandsami and Jayaprakash in the lead roles.

Lens has been screened in several film festivals including , South Asian International Film Festival, Jagran Film Festival, Chennai International Film Festival, Pune International Film Festival, Bengaluru International Film Festival, Lonavala International Film Festival, and Bioscope International Film Festival. The Malayalam version was distributed by LJ Films and the Tamil version was distributed by producer Vetrimaaran under his company Grassroot Film Company.

The film was later released on Netflix.

Plot

Aravind's growing estrangement with his wife, owing to his indulgence in virtual sexual relationships, paves way for his encounter with a stranger. This random experience takes a turn for the worst when the stranger requests Aravind to witness his suicide on a Skype call.

Cast

 Anandsami as Yohan
 Jayaprakash Radhakrishnan as Aravind
 Vinutha Lal as Angel
 Misha Ghoshal as Swathi
 Kulothungan Udayakumar as the Inspector in Munnar

Reception
The film was received positively with the audience liking the fact that it addressed concerns about privacy and adult content on the web. Malayalam director Vineeth Sreenivasan said "There are so many things I wanted to say about this film. In fact, if the movie was released already, I would have written in detail. For now, I' ll just say this... this film needs to be seen by today's internet-savvy generation. It is relevant, gritty, honest, and it haunts." Baradwaj Rangan of Film Companion wrote "Lens is a refreshingly grown-up film...not only does it deal with a grown-up subject, it also refuses to infantilise the audience by treating its points as messages. Lens understands that a movie isn’t a pharmacological product: pop one and cure a social ill. It lays out problems without the comfort of easy solutions."

Awards
Best Debut Director --- 19th Gollapudi Srinivas National Award
Best Screenplay — Lonavala International Film Festival
Best Direction — Lonavala International Film Festival
Best Screenplay — Bioscope Global Film Festival
Best Director ------- 7th Jagaran Film Festival.

References

External links
 
 Lens official trailer on YouTube
 Special screening of Lens in Chennai as part of Gollapudi National Awards ceremony.

2016 films
2010s Tamil-language films
Indian thriller drama films
Indian multilingual films
Films about security and surveillance
2016 thriller drama films
2010s Malayalam-language films
2016 drama films